Lawrence Channel is a marine channel in Laubeuf Fjord, running north–south between Wyatt Island and Arrowsmith Peninsula, Loubet Coast, Antarctica. It was named by the UK Antarctic Place-Names Committee in 1984 after Captain Stuart J. Lawrence, Master of the British Antarctic Survey ship Bransfield for some years from 1974.

References

Channels of the Southern Ocean
Straits of Graham Land
Loubet Coast